Kornberg is an habitational German, Swedish, and Jewish (Ashkenazic) surname. Its principal meaning is "grain hill", from German Korn "grain" + Berg "mountain", "hill".

Notable people with the surname include:

 Arthur Kornberg (1918–2007), American biochemist, winner of the 1959 Nobel Prize in Medicine, father of Roger D. Kornberg and Thomas B. Kornberg
 Hans Leo Kornberg (1928–2019), British biochemist,
 Roger D. Kornberg (born 1947), American biochemist, winner of the 2006 Nobel Prize in Chemistry
 Thomas B. Kornberg (born 1948), American biochemist, University of California, San Francisco

References

German-language surnames